Wrightwood was a station on the Chicago Transit Authority's North Side Main Line, which is now part of the Brown Line. The station was located at Wrightwood Avenue, Lincoln Avenue, and Sheffield Avenue in the Lincoln Park neighborhood of Chicago. Wrightwood was situated south of Diversey and north of Fullerton. Wrightwood opened on May 31, 1900, and closed on August 1, 1949, along with 22 other stations as part of a CTA service revision.

Station details

Operations and connections
Wrightwood was one of five stations on the Ravenswood route alongside Western, Irving Park, Addison, and Paulina served by the Lincoln Avenue streetcar. A carbarn was built at the corner of Lincoln and Wrightwood between 1908 and 1910.

Streetcars serving the Ashland branch of the Lincoln Avenue streetcar terminated south at Wrightwood instead of downtown starting February 1, 1889. This ceased by July 1913, when branch streetcar service was cut back farther north at Belmont.

References

Defunct Chicago "L" stations
Railway stations in the United States opened in 1900
Railway stations closed in 1949
1900 establishments in Illinois
1949 disestablishments in Illinois